Bathydiscus is an extinct genus from a well-known class of fossil marine arthropods, the trilobites. It lived during the Botomian stage.

Distribution 
Bathydiscus is known from the Lower Cambrian of the United States (unnamed formation, East Chatham Quad, Columbia County, New York State ), and of Canada (Newfoundland).

Ecology 
Bathydiscus  occurs in association with other Weymouthiidae (Acidiscus, Acimetopus, Analox, Bolboparia, Leptochilodiscus, Serrodiscus), Calodiscus, 
several species of Olenellus and Bonnia (Dorypygidae).

References 

Weymouthiidae 
Agnostida genera
Cambrian trilobites
Extinct animals of North America